The 2002 Scott Tournament of Hearts Canadian women's national curling championship, was played at the Keystone Centre in Brandon, Manitoba. The defending champion, representing Team Canada, Colleen Jones and her rink from the Mayflower Curling Club in Halifax, Nova Scotia won her second straight Hearts.

Teams

Standings

Results

Draw 1

Draw 2

Draw 3

Draw 4

Draw 5

Draw 6

Draw 7

Draw 8

Draw 9

Draw 10

Draw 11

Draw 12

Draw 13

Draw 14

Draw 15

Draw 16

Draw 17

Page playoffs

1 vs. 2

3 vs. 4

Semi-final

Final

References

Scotties Tournament of Hearts
Scott Tournament of Hearts
Scott Tournament Of Hearts, 2002
Curling competitions in Brandon, Manitoba
2002 in women's curling